Fyodor Petrovich Lyakhovsky, also known as Fedir Petrovych Liakhovskiy, (14 February 1936 – 30 May 2017) was a Soviet sprint canoer who competed in the early 1960s. At the 1960 Summer Olympics in Rome, he finished fifth in the K-1 4 × 500 m event.

References

External links 

Sports-reference.com profile

1936 births
Canoeists at the 1960 Summer Olympics
Living people
Olympic canoeists of the Soviet Union
Soviet male canoeists
Ukrainian male canoeists